Chi Man-hsien (born 1 February 1968) is a Taiwanese wrestler. He competed in the men's freestyle 82 kg at the 1988 Summer Olympics.

References

1968 births
Living people
Taiwanese male sport wrestlers
Olympic wrestlers of Taiwan
Wrestlers at the 1988 Summer Olympics
Place of birth missing (living people)